Marital conversion is religious conversion upon marriage, either as a conciliatory act, or a mandated requirement according to a particular religious belief. Endogamous religious cultures may have certain opposition to interfaith marriage and ethnic assimilation, and may assert prohibitions against the conversion ("marrying out") of one their own claimed adherents. Conversely, they may require the marital conversion of those who wish to marry one of their adherents.

Christianity

Catholicism

Historically, in the case of the Catholic Church, Catholics were obligated to marry only other Catholics (including those of the Eastern Rite), and marital conversion of the non-Catholic party was considered almost obligatory. However, it was permissible for a Catholic to marry an Independent/Old Catholic (who is not in communion with Rome) or non-Catholic baptized in a manner recognized by the Catholic Church as valid (i.e., mainline Christians such as Episcopalians or Lutherans, and Eastern Orthodox), but a dispensation had to be granted by a bishop and the non-Catholic party had to agree to raise the children as Catholics. Marriage to unbaptized persons, meaning all non-Christians and members of some Christian denominations (such as Unitarians or Mormons), was forbidden. Civil marriage can be the only alternative if a religious wedding is not possible under these circumstances.

Iglesia ni Cristo
The Iglesia ni Cristo, a non-trinitarian church that is the largest indigenous Christian denomination in the Philippines, requires non-adherents marrying members to convert to the religion prior to the wedding. Conversely, members found to have married outside of the religion are automatically expelled from the church. A church wedding is required after the civil one.

Hinduism
Hinduism has allowances for such practice even if Hinduism considers all religions are a way to God, but there can be political differences and so marital conversion is sometimes discouraged. Throughout Hindu history, interreligious marriages have also been a way for keeping the peace and building alliances.

Islam

In general, Islam allows for marriage between a man and woman as "believers". Culturally, it is accepted that marriage between a follower of Islam (Muslim) and a Christian or Jew does not require conversion. Traditionally, however, marriages between Muslims and a follower of Hinduism or other polytheistic religions requires conversion to Islam. Although, there are no official conversion rules, similar to Jewish laws of Halakkah (for marriage), Islamic marriage laws are generally guided by traditional interpretations. The only requirement in marriage and conversion is that the children from that marriage be raised as "believers," a common Islamic term for Muslims. 
The Qur'anic verses generally quoted are:

Judaism

Jewish views on religious conversion due to intermarriage are largely in opposition to such marriage even if such marriages are tolerated. If a non-Jew wishes to become a Jew, in the sense that they practice Judaism and thus are accepted as a Jew, they are, depending on the Jewish religious tradition, typically welcome. On the other hand, if a Jew desires to leave Judaism, they are regarded as apostates or "assimilators" into a non-Jewish religion or culture. Non-Jewish cultures, tend to be regarded and portrayed as negative; being idolatrous, or rejecting of God (as Jews conceive God).

Some Jewish leaders have controversially referred to Jewish intermarriage as being a "Silent Holocaust," particularly in 20th-21st century America where as many as 47% of American Jews have intermarried with non-Jews in past two decades. Such cultural and religious assimilation is said to represent a slow destruction of the Jewish people. Others have expressed a different view, accepting or tolerating such marriages, instead focusing their attention towards the concept that the children of a Jewish parent be raised Jewish, with some sense of their identity rooted in Judaism and in Jewish culture. However, some children of a Jewish parent were raised in the non-Jewish parent's religion while maintaining a sense of Jewish ethnicity and identity.

See also
Interfaith marriage
Matrimonial dispensation
Disparity of cult

References

Marriage and religion
Religious conversion
Conversion